Phillip Danault (born February 24, 1993) is a Canadian professional ice hockey center and an alternate captain for the Los Angeles Kings of the National Hockey League (NHL). He was drafted 26th overall by the Chicago Blackhawks in the 2011 NHL Entry Draft, and made his NHL debut with them in 2014. Danault also played six seasons for the Montreal Canadiens.

Playing career
As a youth, Danault played in the 2005 and 2006 Quebec International Pee-Wee Hockey Tournaments with the Victoriaville Tigres minor ice hockey team. He later played junior ice hockey with the Victoriaville Tigres and Moncton Wildcats of the Quebec Major Junior Hockey League (QMJHL). He was selected 26th overall in the 2011 NHL Entry Draft by the Chicago Blackhawks.

On March 30, 2012, he was assigned to the Blackhawks' American Hockey League (AHL) affiliate, the Rockford IceHogs.

In the 2014–15 season, Danault was recalled from the IceHogs by the Blackhawks and made his NHL debut on November 22, 2014, in a 7–1 victory over the Edmonton Oilers.

Danault was initially assigned to the Rockford IceHogs to begin the 2015–16 season. On December 18, 2015, Danault was recalled from Rockford to the Blackhawks, and on December 20, he earned his first NHL point with an assist on Andrew Shaw's goal in a 4–3 win against the San Jose Sharks. He scored his first career NHL goal on January 8, 2016, the game-winner in a 3–1 win against the Buffalo Sabres. After solidifying a role amongst the Blackhawks' fourth line and contributing with 5 points in 30 games, on February 26, 2016, Danault was acquired by the Montreal Canadiens (along with Chicago's second-round pick in the 2018 NHL Entry Draft) in exchange for forwards Dale Weise and Tomáš Fleischmann. On July 5, 2016, Danault re-signed with the Canadiens on a two-year contract.

On January 13, 2018 during a game against the Boston Bruins, Danault was hit in the head by a shot from Zdeno Chára. Danault remained motionless on the ice for several minutes. He was eventually stretchered off the ice and taken to the hospital. The Canadiens  lost the game 4–3 in a shootout.

On July 15, 2018, Phillip re-signed with the Canadiens agreeing to a three-year contract. On 22 December 2018, Danault scored his first career NHL hat-trick in a 4–3 overtime victory against the Vegas Golden Knights. Danault finished the 2018–19 season with a career-high 53 points, and finished seventh in votes for the Selke Trophy.

Danault became an unrestricted free agent in the summer of 2021, and on July 28, he signed a six-year, $33 million contract with the Los Angeles Kings. During the season, Danault scored a career high 27 goals with the Kings, helping them clinch a playoff spot for the first time since 2018.

On March 9, 2023, Danault scored his 100th NHL goal.

Career statistics

Regular season and playoffs

International

Awards and honours

References

External links
 

1993 births
Living people
Canadian expatriate ice hockey players in the United States
Canadian ice hockey left wingers
Chicago Blackhawks draft picks
Chicago Blackhawks players
Ice hockey people from Quebec
Los Angeles Kings players
Moncton Wildcats players
Montreal Canadiens players
National Hockey League first-round draft picks
French Quebecers
People from Victoriaville
Rockford IceHogs (AHL) players
Victoriaville Tigres players